Magdalena Lekovska (born 20 July 1999) is a Macedonian footballer who plays as a goalkeeper for 1. liga club ŽFK Ljuboten and the North Macedonia women's national team.

Club career
Lekovska has played for ŽFK Top Gol, ŽFK Dragon 2014 and Istatov in North Macedonia.

References

1999 births
Living people
Macedonian women's footballers
Women's association football goalkeepers
North Macedonia women's international footballers